Desuri is a Tehsil headquarter, located in the Pali district of Rajasthan, India.

References 

Villages in Pali district